Ljubljana Hippodrome or Stožice Hippodrome, a horse racecourse stadium in the capital of Slovenia, is the main sport venue of this kind in the country. It is only 3 kilometres north from the center of Ljubljana. It was built in 1957. It is the seat of 'Horse Club Ljubljana'.

Events
 In 1996, Pope John Paul II had Mass in front of 150,000 people, which is the biggest crowd in Slovenia ever.
 On August 8, 1997, American pop-star Michael Jackson planned to perform here a concert as part of his HIStory World Tour. The concert was cancelled due to low ticket sales.
 In 2009, The Killers performed in the Hippodrome in front of 30,000 people, as a part of their Day & Age Tour.
 In 2009, Madonna was scheduled to have a Sticky & Sweet Tour concert, but it was cancelled. According to Slovenian media only 7,000 out of 63,000 tickets were sold.

References

Sources
 http://www.hipodrom-lj.si/index.php?klik=-oklubu 

Horse racing venues in Slovenia
Music venues in Slovenia
Hippodrome
Hippodrome